SS Niels Poulson was a Liberty ship built in the United States during World War II. She was named after Niels Poulson, an architect and philanthropist.

Construction
Niels Poulson was laid down on 6 July 1944, under a Maritime Commission (MARCOM) contract, MC hull 2371, by J.A. Jones Construction, Brunswick, Georgia; she was sponsored by Mrs. W.H. McWhirter, and launched on 18 August 1944.

History
She was allocated to the Dichmann Wright & Pugh Company, on 5 September 1944. On 6 December 1946, she struck a mine off Gorgona, Italy, and was towed to Leghorn, Italy, where she was declared a constructive total loss (CTL) on 19 December.

References

Bibliography

 
 
 
 
 

 

Liberty ships
Ships built in Brunswick, Georgia
1944 ships
Ships sunk by mines
Maritime incidents in 1946